A van is a road vehicle.

Van, VAN and other capitalizations may refer to:

People and fictional characters
 van (Dutch), a common prefix in Dutch language surnames, including a list of people with "van" in their surname
 Van (given name), including a list of people and fictional characters with the given name or nickname
 Van (surname), including a list of people

Places

Iran
 Van, Iran a village

Turkey
 Lake Van, a lake in eastern Turkey
 Kingdom of Van, an Iron Age civilization centered on Lake Van (860–590 BC)
 Van, Turkey, a city the east shore of Lake Van
 Van Province, a modern Turkish province
 Van (electoral district), the electoral district of the province
 Eyalet of Van, the province during the Ottoman Empire (1548–1864)
 Van Vilayet, the province during the later Ottoman period (1875–1922)

United Kingdom
 Van, Caerphilly, a suburb east of Caerphilly, Wales
 Van, Llanidloes, a hamlet in Wales

United States
 Van, Arkansas, an unincorporated community
 Van, Missouri, an unincorporated community
 Van, Oregon, an unincorporated community
 Van, Texas, a city
 Van, Virginia, an unincorporated community
 Van, West Virginia, a census-designated place

Vanuatu 
 Vanuatu's IOC, CGF and FIFA country code

Organizations
 Vehicle Area Network, intra-vehicle network 
 Vereniging Automatenhandel Nederland (VAN), the Dutch branch of EUROMAT
 Voluntary Arts Network, UK & Republic of Ireland development agency 
 NGP VAN, a voter database and web hosting service provider
 Van's Aircraft, founded by Richard Van Grunsen
 FC Van, an Armenian football club based in Charentsavan
 FC Van Yerevan, a defunct Armenian football club from the capital Yerevan, founded in 1990

Transportation
 van, British English for a railway covered goods wagon 
 Van Railway, former railway between Van and Caersws, Wales
 VAN, the IATA code for Van Ferit Melen Airport, Turkey

Other uses
 , the ISO 639 code for the Valman language of Papua New Guinea
 Value-added network (VAN), a service intermediary between businesses for sharing data
 Van, Vanguard (military tactics)
 Van (band), Swedish musical group
 Van cat, a cat from the Lake Van region
 VAN method, experiment in earthquake detection

See also

 Vans (disambiguation)
 The Van (disambiguation)
 Vann (disambiguation)
 Vanne (disambiguation)